The Seventeenth Wisconsin Legislature convened from January 13, 1864, to April 4, 1864, in regular session.

Senators representing odd-numbered districts were newly elected for this session and were serving the first year of a two-year term. Assembly members were elected to a one-year term. Assembly members and odd-numbered senators were elected in the general election of November 3, 1863. Senators representing even-numbered districts were serving the second year of their two-year term, having been elected in the general election held on November 4, 1862.

Major events
 January 4, 1864: Inauguration of James T. Lewis as the 7th Governor of Wisconsin.
 May 5–7, 1864: Battle of the Wilderness took place in Spotsylvania County and Orange County, Virginia.  Four regiments of Wisconsin Volunteers participated in the battle.
 May 9–21, 1864: Battle of Spotsylvania Court House took place in Spotsylvania County, Virginia.  Five regiments of Wisconsin Volunteers participated in the battle.
 May 31June 12, 1864: Battle of Cold Harbor took place in Hanover County, Virginia.  Five regiments of Wisconsin Volunteers participated in the battle.
 September 2, 1864: Union Army occupied Atlanta, Georgia.
 November 8, 1864: Abraham Lincoln re-elected as President of the United States.

Major legislation
 February 19, 1864: Act to organize the county of Burnett, and locate the county seat thereof, 1864 Act 74
 February 26, 1864: Joint Resolution relative to the extension of time for the payment of government bounties to volunteers, 1864 Joint Resolution 2
 March 5, 1864: Joint Resolution relative to the vigorous prosecution of the war, the duty of congress and the people, tendering thanks to the army and navy, and suggesting the renomination of Abraham Lincoln, 1864 Joint Resolution 4
 March 22, 1864: Act to incorporate "Marquette College" in the second ward of the city of Milwaukee, 1864 Act 180
 April 4, 1864: Act to guard against the abuse of the elective franchise, and to preserve the purity of elections, by a registration of electors, 1864 Act 445

Party summary

Senate summary

Assembly summary

Sessions
 1st Regular session: January 13, 1864 – April 4, 1864

Leaders

Senate leadership
 President of the Senate: Wyman Spooner
 President pro tempore: Smith S. Wilkinson

Assembly leadership
 Speaker of the Assembly: William W. Field

Members

Members of the Senate
Members of the Wisconsin Senate for the Seventeenth Wisconsin Legislature:

Members of the Assembly
Members of the Assembly for the Seventeenth Wisconsin Legislature:

Employees

Senate employees
 Chief Clerk: Frank M. Stewart
 Assistant Clerk: P. H. Brady
 Bookkeeper: J. Spooner
 Engrossing Clerk: Sineus B. Dibble
 Enrolling Clerk: Thomas Marshall
 Transcribing Clerk: F. O. Wisner
 Sergeant-at-Arms: Nelson Williams
 1st Assistant Sergeant-at-Arms: H. Esperson
 2nd Assistant Sergeant-at-Arms: John B. Eugene
 Postmaster: Henry H. Taylor
 Assistant Postmaster: S. Raymond
 Doorkeeper: G. M. Cary
 Assistant Doorkeeper: J. P. Miller
 Assistant Doorkeeper: J. H. Jones
 Assistant Doorkeeper: Otis A. Albee
 Assistant Doorkeeper: William P. Close
 Gallery Doorkeeper: B. S. Miller
 Firemen:
 Barnet Wilson
 William W. Baker
 William Holden
 Messengers:
 John C. Hutchins
 Albert F. Dexter
 Rufus H. Roys
 William C. Jones
 C. C. Frey
 Frank C. Freeman
 Porter: John Crowley

Assembly employees
 Chief Clerk: John S. Dean
 Assistant Clerk: Ephraim W. Young
 Bookkeeper: E. L. Fitzhugh
 Engrossing Clerk: A. L. Rockwell
 Enrolling Clerk: J. H. Balch
 Transcribing Clerk: A. C. Byers
 Sergeant-at-Arms: Alexander McDonald Thomson
 1st Assistant Sergeant-at-Arms: William P. Forsyth
 2nd Assistant Sergeant-at-Arms: Lewis M. Hammond
 Postmaster: N. A. Spooner
 1st Assistant Postmaster: Hiram Beckwith
 2nd Assistant Postmaster: Oscar Babcock
 Doorkeepers: 
 Franklin Kelly
 W. L. Abbott
 W. E. Angell
 C. Saran
 C. E. Tanburg
 William Spencer
 Firemen:
 Oliver Johnson
 A. C. Stannard
 Robert Axon
 C. McCarthy
 Speaker's Messenger: Adam C. Waltz
 Chief Clerk's Messenger: James E. Dean
 Sergeant-at-Arms' Messenger: Arthur Tilden
 Messengers:
 Moses Flesh
 Patrick McKanna
 Robert Airis
 Louis Sholes
 Marion M. Young
 William P. Beach
 Linus S. Webb
 Fred Chynoweth

References

Notes

External links

1864 in Wisconsin
Wisconsin
Wisconsin legislative sessions